The 16th Annual American Music Awards were held on January 30, 1989.

Winners and nominees

References

 Rock On The Net: 16th American Music Awards (presented in 1989)

1989